Budków may refer to the following places in Poland:
Budków, Lower Silesian Voivodeship (south-west Poland)
Budków, Opoczno County in Łódź Voivodeship (central Poland)
Budków, Piotrków County in Łódź Voivodeship (central Poland)